Chebenli (Sebenle) is a rural locality (a selo) and the administrative center of Chebenlinsky Selsoviet, Alsheyevsky District, Bashkortostan, Russia.  The population was 290 .

Geography 
Chebenli is located 30 km south of Rayevsky (the district's administrative centre) by road. Tyubeteyevo is the nearest rural locality.

References 

Rural localities in Alsheyevsky District